Super Sisters - Chalega Pyar Ka Jaadu (English: Super Sisters - Magic of love will prevail) is an Indian television series that  went on air on 6 August 2018 on SAB TV. It starred Vaishali Takkar and Gaurav Wadhwa.

Plot

Two sisters, Shivani and Siddhi share an unbreakable bond, live in Sohnapura, a small village in Haryana. While Shivani is beautiful, sweet, well-mannered, soft and obedient 21-year old girl who is a Sanskrit, hindi and a music teacher while Siddhi is a rough tomboy fun and carefree.
 
Shivani and Siddhi both live in a village with their uncle Shyamal Chachu who is a member of the organisation "Jaado Se Janseva" JSJ which helps people through magic, and travels from town to town on the pretext of selling shoes. A young, handsome, charming, dashing, kind and a flirtitious business man, the heir of Oberoi Empire Ashmit Oberoi comes to the village to donate money for the school and ends up giving more money for the hospital. Siddhi's uncle returns after being discovered by members of the organization "Jaadoo Se Tabaahi" JST which spreads havoc through magic. He decides to tell Shivani about the magic. He tells her about JSJ "Jaadoo se Janseva", how he helps others and how their ancestors got their powers from Lord Shiva, by their hard penace with this penace Lord Shiva got impressed and blessed them powers to help people but the organization against this is "JST" and that he has been discovered by members of this organization and they are in danger so they have to leave this village and move to Gurugram,Haryana to their aunt and uncle's house as it is a safe place. A selfish , miserly, evil and shrewd woman Manolekha is introduced with her husband and her daughter who have just became rich two months ago by selling their land in Sohnapura to Ashmit and move to Gurugram and bought a lavish house, they want to marry their daughter, Isha for Ashmit's wealth. Siddhi and Shivani find out that Ashmit has been making donations in other villages to get free land to build factories and confront him in front of everyone. Ashmit then explains to Shivani and the village people that he wanted the land as the lake near it was useless and polluted and only wanted to build water purification sites for the people and leaves. Siddhi urges Shivani to apologise to Ashmit before he leaves. Shivani runs and apologises to Ashmit and ends up falling in love with him.

Cast

Main

 Vaishali Takkar as Shivani Sharma 
 Gaurav Wadhwa as Ashmit Oberoi

Recurring
 Muskaan Bamne as Siddhi Sharma 
 Manini Mishra as Manolekha "Mano"/Mini Sharma
 Krunal Pandit as Mama ji
 Isha Anand Sharma as Isha "Ishu" Sharma
 Nayan Shukla as Saroj, Mama & Mami's butler
Pranoti Pradhan as Chitralekha "Chitru" Mausi  
 Vijay Badlani as Shyamal Sharma/Chachu

Cameos
 Shruti Rawat as Soochna Prasaran Mantri
 Gaurav Dubey as Deepak Tijori, Fake Bridegroom for Isha  (Character recurring from Sajan Re Phir Jhooth Mat Bolo)

References

Sony SAB original programming
2018 Indian television series debuts
Indian comedy television series
Television about magic
Indian fantasy television series
Television series by Optimystix Entertainment